Johannes Baumann (27 November 1874, in Herisau – 8 September 1953) was a Swiss politician and member of the Swiss Federal Council (1934–1940).

He was elected to the Federal Council of Switzerland on 22 March 1934 and handed over office on 31 December 1940. He was affiliated to the Free Democratic Party. 

During his office time he held the Department of Justice and Police and was President of the Confederation in 1938.

External links 
 
 
 
 

1874 births
1953 deaths
People from Appenzell Ausserrhoden
Swiss Calvinist and Reformed Christians
Free Democratic Party of Switzerland politicians
Members of the Federal Council (Switzerland)
Members of the Council of States (Switzerland)
Presidents of the Council of States (Switzerland)
University of Basel alumni
University of Bern alumni
Leipzig University alumni
University of Zurich alumni